Vieth is a surname. Notable people with the surname include:

Dorothee Vieth (born 1960), German Paralympic cyclist
Errol Vieth (born 1950), Australian academic
Michelle Vieth (born 1979), American-Mexican actress

See also
Vieth v. Jubelirer, United States Supreme Court case
Surnames from given names